Streptomyces graminilatus is a bacterium species from the genus of Streptomyces which has been isolated from the plant Sasa borealis in Damyang in Korea.

See also 
 List of Streptomyces species

References

Further reading

External links
Type strain of Streptomyces graminilatus at BacDive -  the Bacterial Diversity Metadatabase

graminilatus
Bacteria described in 2014